Carneiro is a common Portuguese and Galician surname, meaning "sheep". It was very likely either a metonymic occupational name for a shepherd, or a  habitational name derived from any of the several places called Carneiro in the North of Portugal.

Notable people with the surname include:

 Alberto Carneiro, Portuguese artist
 António Carneiro, Portuguese Expressionist painter, illustrator, poet and art professor
 Antônio Ernesto Gomes Carneiro, Brazilian military officer who fought in the Paraguayan War
 António de Mariz Carneiro, Portuguese nobleman who served as the official cosmographer to the Portuguese crown
 Antonio dos Reis Carneiro, Brazilian basketball administrator
 António Soares Carneiro, Portuguese military officer and politician
 Carlos Carneiro, Portuguese footballer
 Carlos Carneiro, Portuguese handballer
 Enéas Carneiro, Brazilian physician and politician
 Eva Carneiro, British sports medicine specialist 
 Flávio Carneiro, Brazilian writer
 Francisco Sá Carneiro, Portuguese politician and former Prime Minister of Portugal
 Higino Carneiro, Angolan military officer and politician
 Honório Hermeto Carneiro Leão, Brazilian politician, diplomat, judge and monarchist of the Empire of Brazil
 Jessel Carneiro, Indian footballer
 Joana Carneiro, Portuguese conductor
 João Emanuel Carneiro. Brazilian screenwriter
 Jorge García Carneiro, Venezuelan politician
 José da Gama Carneiro e Sousa, Portuguese count who served as the sixth Prime Minister of Portugal
 Juliana Carneiro da Cunha, Brazilian actress
 Keirrison de Souza Carneiro, Brazilian footballer
 Luís Carlos Pereira Carneiro, Portuguese footballer
 Marcos Carneiro de Mendonça, Brazilian footballer
 Mário de Sá-Carneiro, Portuguese poet and writer
 Melchior Carneiro, Portuguese Jesuit missionary bishop
 Newton Carneiro Affonso da Costa, Brazilian mathematician, logician, and philosopher
 Paulo Henrique Carneiro Filho, Brazilian footballer
 Pedro Carneiro, Portuguese musician
 Roan Carneiro, Brazilian mixed martial artist
 Robert L. Carneiro, American anthropologist and curator of the American Museum of Natural History
 Tiago Carneiro, Portuguese footballer
 Tiago Carneiro da Cunha, Brazilian artist

Portuguese-language surnames